Simon Karori (born 28 August 1959) is a retired Kenyan long-distance runner.

At the 1991 World Cross Country Championships he won a silver medal in the long race. This was enough to allow Kenya to win a gold medal in the team competition.

References

External links

1959 births
Living people
Kenyan male long-distance runners
Kenyan male cross country runners